The Douady rabbit is any of various particular filled Julia sets whose parameter is near the center of a period 3 bud of the Mandelbrot set for complex quadratic map. It is named after French mathematician Adrien Douady.

Formula
The rabbit is generated by iterating the Mandelbrot set map  on the complex plane with  fixed to lie in the period three bulb off the main cardiod and  ranging over the plane. The pixels in the image are then colored to show whether for a particular value of  the iteration converged or diverged.

Variants

Twisted rabbit or rabbits with twisted ears  = is the composition of the “rabbit” polynomial with n-th powers of the Dehn twists about its ears.

Corabbit is symmetrical image of rabbit.   Here parameter   It is one of 2 other polynomials inducing the same permutation of their post-critical set are the rabbit.

3D
The Julia set has no direct analog in 3D.

4D
Quaternion Julia set with parameters c = −0,123 + 0.745i and a cross section in the XY plane. The "Douady Rabbit" Julia set is visible in the cross section.

Embedded

A small "embedded" homeomorphic copy of rabbit in the center of a Julia set

Fat

The fat rabbit or chubby rabbit has c at the root of 1/3-limb of the Mandelbrot set. It has a  parabolic fixed point with 3 petals.

n-th eared
 period 4 bulb rabbit = Three-Eared Rabbit
 period 5 bulb rabbit = Four-Eared Rabbit
In general, the rabbit for the period-(n+1) bulb off the main cardiod will have n ears

Perturbed
Perturbed rabbit

Forms of the complex quadratic map
There are two common forms for the complex quadratic map .  The first, also called the complex logistic map, is written as

The second common form is

Note that  is invariant under the substitution .

Mandelbrot and filled Julia sets

The nature of what happens in the mapping plane under repeated application of  depends on where  (or ) is in the control plane. The Mandelbrot set consists of those points in the control plane such that the associated filled Julia set in the mapping plane is connected.

Figure 1 shows the Mandelbrot set when  is the control parameter, and Figure 2 shows the Mandelbrot set when  is the control parameter.

The Douady rabbit

The Douady rabbit is most easily described in terms of the Mandelbrot set as shown in Figure 1 (above). In this figure, the Mandelbrot set, at least when viewed from a distance, appears as two back-to-back unit discs with sprouts. Consider the sprouts at the one- and five-o'clock positions on the right disk or the sprouts at the seven- and eleven-o'clock positions on the left disk. When  is within one of these four sprouts, the associated filled Julia set in the mapping plane is a Douady rabbit. Moreover, the map  has three attracting fixed points.

For example, Figure 3 shows Douady's rabbit in the  plane when , a point in the five-o'clock sprout of the right disk.

Corresponding to these relations there are the results

As a second example, Figure 4 shows a Douady rabbit when , a point in the eleven-o'clock sprout on the left disk. (As noted earlier,  is invariant under this transformation.)  The rabbit now sits more symmetrically in the plane. The period-three fixed points then are located at

.

Twisted rabbit problem
In the early 1980s, Hubbard posed the so-called twisted rabbit problem, a polynomial classification problem. The goal is to determine Thurston equivalence types of functions of complex numbers that usually are not given by a formula (these are called topological polynomials)." 
 given a topological quadratic whose branch point is periodic with period three, to which quadratic polynomial is it Thurston equivalent ?
 determining the  equivalence class of “twisted rabbits”, i.e. composita of the “rabbit” polynomial with nth powers of the Dehn twists about its ears.

It was originally solved by Laurent Bartholdi and Volodymyr Nekrashevych using iterated monodromy groups.

The generalization of the twisted rabbit problem to the case where the number of post-critical points is arbitrarily large is also solved

Gallery

See also
 Dragon curve
 Herman ring
 Siegel disc

References

External links
 
 
 Adrien Douady: La dynamique du lapin (1996) - video on the YouTube

Fractals
Limit sets